Dehydrohexahydroxydiphenic acid is a group found in dehydroellagitannins. It is formed from hexahydroxydiphenic acid (HHDP) through oxidation of the plant hydrolysable tannins. It is found in ellagitannins such as euphorbin A, geraniin or mallotusinic acid.

In geraniin, it is forming an equilibrium mixture of six-membered hemi-ketal and five-membered hemi-ketal  forms.

References 

Ellagitannins
Carboxylic acids
Heterocyclic compounds with 3 rings
Oxygen heterocycles